Easy Money Baby is the first studio album by Puerto Rican rapper Myke Towers.

Artwork 
The album's artwork features Myke Towers posing with his newborn son, who was born just 20 days before the release of the album. 
 
The title of the album is a tribute to his son and also a phrase he goes by "when everything is going great in my life".

Track listing 
Songwriting credits adapted from BMI.
 

 
Notes
  signifies an uncredited co-producer

Charts

Weekly charts

Year-end charts

Certifications and sales

References 

 
2020 albums
Myke Towers albums